Diexim Expresso Aviaçao (operating as Diexim Expresso) was an airline based in Luanda, Angola. It operated scheduled services linking the main towns and cities in Angola, as well as VIP flights and charter services within Angola and to Namibia. Its main base was Quatro de Fevereiro Airport, Luanda. The airline was on the list of air carriers banned in the EU.

History 
The airline was established in 2003 and is wholly owned by Grupo BD-Bartolomeu Dias. On 14 November 2008, Diexim Expresso was added to the list of air carriers banned in the EU due to safety concerns. Meanwhile, the airline ceased operations.

Destinations
Diexim Expresso served the following destinations as of November 2009:

Fleet 
The Diexim Expresso fleet included the following aircraft as of April 2012:

References

External links
 
Grupo BD

Defunct airlines of Angola
Airlines established in 2003
Airlines disestablished in 2008